The Barnett Bobb House, also known as the Old Log House, is a historic building in downtown York, Pennsylvania, York County, Pennsylvania.  It was originally located at the intersection of Pershing and College Avenues. In 1968, it was moved to its current location and restored.  It is on the same site as the General Horatio Gates House and Golden Plough Tavern. It was built in 1811, and is a two-story log dwelling with dovetailed corners.  It houses a museum operated by the York County Heritage Trust that showcases family life during the 1830s.

It was added to the National Register of Historic Places in 1975.

See also 
 National Register of Historic Places listings in York County, Pennsylvania

References

External links
 York County Heritage Trust website

Historic house museums in Pennsylvania
Houses completed in 1811
Houses on the National Register of Historic Places in Pennsylvania
Buildings and structures in York, Pennsylvania
Houses in York County, Pennsylvania
Museums in York County, Pennsylvania
National Register of Historic Places in York County, Pennsylvania